Joe Hayes (born 9 January 1963) is an Irish retired hurling manager and former player. His league and championship career with the Tipperary senior team spanned eight seasons from 1986 to 1994. 

Hayes first appeared for the Clonoulty–Rossmore club at juvenile and underage levels, before eventually joining the club's senior team. In 1989, he won a county championship medal.

Hayes made his debut on the inter-county scene at the age of sixteen when he was selected for the Tipperary minor team. He enjoyed two championship seasons with the minor team, winning an All-Ireland medal in his debut season. Hayes later joined the Tipperary under-21 team and was a back-to-back All-Ireland runner-up. He made his senior debut during the 1986-87 league. Over the course of the following eight seasons Hayes had a number of successes, including winning All-Ireland medals in 1989 and 1991. He also won five Munster medals and two National League medals. Hayes later won an All-Ireland medal in the junior grade as player-manager with Monaghan.

Honours

Player

Clonoulty–Rossmore
Tipperary Senior Hurling Championship (1): 1989

Tipperary
All-Ireland Senior Hurling Championship (2): 1989, 1991
Munster Senior Hurling Championship (5): 1987, 1988, 1989, 1991, 1993
National Hurling League (1): 1987-88, 1993-94
Munster Under-21 Hurling Championship (2): 1983, 1984
All-Ireland Minor Hurling Championship (1): 1980
Munster Minor Hurling Championship (1): 1980

Player-manager

Monaghan
All-Ireland Junior Hurling Championship (1): 1997
Ulster Junior Hurling Championship (2): 1997, 1998

References 

1963 births
Living people
Clonoulty-Rossmore hurlers
Tipperary inter-county hurlers
Monaghan inter-county hurlers
All-Ireland Senior Hurling Championship winners